The North Zone cricket team is a first-class cricket team that represents northern Bangladesh in the Bangladesh Cricket League (BCL). It is a composite team of two Bangladeshi first-class teams: Rajshahi Division and Rangpur Division. North Zone has played in the BCL from the opening 2012–13 season. It won the competition in 2016-17. It is owned by the Bangladesh Cricket Board (BCB).

Players

Current squad
Players with international caps are listed in bold

References

Bangladesh Cricket League
Bangladeshi first-class cricket teams
Rajshahi Division
Rangpur Division
Cricket clubs established in 2012
2012 establishments in Bangladesh